Eponymous medical treatments are generally named after the physician or surgeon who described the treatment.

References

treatments